Lindau is a town and island in Lake Constance, Bavaria, Germany.

Lindau may also refer to:

Places

Germany
 Lindau (Anhalt), a town in the district Anhalt-Zerbst, Saxony-Anhalt
 Lindau (Katlenburg-Lindau), a village in the municipality of Katlenburg-Lindau in Lower Saxony
 Lindau, Schleswig-Holstein, part of Amt Dänischer Wohld, district Rendsburg-Eckernförde, Schleswig-Holstein

Bavaria
 Lindau (district), Swabia
 Lindau (island), the Altstadt of the town of Lindau
 Lindau, a district of Trebgast, Kulmbach

Switzerland
 Lindau, Switzerland, Zurich

People
 Lindau (surname)
 Arvid Lindau (1892–1958), Swiss pathologist and bacteriologist
 von Hippel–Lindau disease or familial cerebello retinal angiomatosis, a human eye disease named after Lindau and German ophthalmologist Eugen von Hippel
 von Hippel–Lindau tumor suppressor, a protein in humans, mutations of which may cause the above disease
 von Hippel–Lindau binding protein 1, a human chaperone protein that transports the above protein

Other uses
 Lindau-class minehunter, a class of German coastal minehunters